Jack Avery may refer to:
 
Jack William Avery (1911–1940), British War Reserve Constable who was murdered in Hyde Park, London; see Death of Jack Avery
Jack Avery (singer), American singer and member of the U.S. pop boy band Why Don't We